WBOW (102.7 FM) is a radio station broadcasting a classic hits format. Licensed to Terre Haute, Indiana, it serves the Terre Haute metropolitan area. It first began broadcasting in 1961 under the call sign WPFR. The station is currently owned by Duey E. Wright through licensee Midwest Communications, Inc.

History
The station signed on in 1961 as WPFR. When its companion station AM 1300 (now WIBQ) became WPFR on March 17, 1983, the call sign was changed to WPFR-FM with a Top 40/CHR format, as "WPFR, The All-New Power 103". By 1987, its CHR format had faded into a short-lived Rock 40 format but only lasted for less than a year, retaining back its mainstream format. The company that owned WPFR and WPFR-FM went into bankruptcy and both stations went off the air in 1991. Bomar Broadcasting purchased the license for 102.7 FM in 1992 and changed the call sign to WLEZ on April 1, 1992. In September 1993, the station went back on the air with a beautiful music format after a new transmitter was constructed. By 1997, the format had shifted to a soft adult contemporary format which eventually was supplied by Jones Radio Network.

On May 12, 2003, the station was sold to Crossroads Communications. The call sign was changed to WBOW-FM on September 1, 2003, as "Light Rock B102-7," utilizing the legendary call sign that had been used on 1230 AM and 640 AM in the Terre Haute metropolitan area from 1927 until 2001 when 640 AM went dark. The previous WBOW-FM had operated with those call letters between 1968 and 1974. The legendary call sign was also picked up by sister station AM 1300 in 2002.

On July 1, 2012, WBOW-FM was sold by Crossroads Communications to Midwest Communications and changed its call letters to WDWQ and changed its format to Country, branded as "Q102.7." The sale of WDWQ and sister station WBOW was consummated on October 26, 2012, at a purchase price of $1.3 million.

WDWQ switched to a classic hits format on December 26, 2017, and brought back the WBOW call letters. The first song to air as a classic hits format is Still the One by Orleans.

WBOW's facilities are located at 925 Wabash Avenue, Suite 300 in Terre Haute, Indiana.

Former logos

References

External links
WBOW Website

BOW (FM)
Classic hits radio stations in the United States
Radio stations established in 1961
Midwest Communications radio stations
1961 establishments in Indiana